The 474th Tactical Electronic Warfare Squadron is an inactive United States Air Force unit.  Its first predecessor is the 474th Bombardment Squadron, which served as a medium bomber training unit from 1942 to 1944, when it was disbanded in a reorganization of Army Air Forces training units.

The squadron's second predecessor is the 474th Tactical Fighter Squadron, which flew North American F-86 Sabre and North American F-100 Super Sabre fighters from October 1957 until March 1959, when it was inactivated and transferred its personnel and equipment to another unit.  The two squadrons were consolidated in September 1985.

History

World War II training operations

The 474th Bombardment Squadron was activated on 17 July 1942 at Barksdale Field, Louisiana as one of the original components of the 335th Bombardment Group, and was equipped with Martin B-26 Marauders.  It became part of Third Air Force, which was responsible for the majority of medium bomber training for the Army Air Forces (AAF). The squadron drew its cadre from elements of the 17th Bombardment Group, which was in the process of converting to the B-26 from the North American B-25 Mitchell.

The 474th acted as a Replacement Training Unit (RTU) for the B-26.  The RTU was an oversized unit which trained individual pilots and aircrews, after which they would be assigned to operational units. However, the AAF found that standard military units, whose manning was based on relatively inflexible tables of organization were not well adapted to the training mission.  Accordingly, it adopted a more functional system in which each base was organized into a separate numbered unit, manned according to the base's specific needs. As this reorganization was implemented in the Spring of 1944, he 335th Group, its components and supporting units at Barksdale, were disbanded on 1 May and replaced by the 331st AAF Base Unit (Medium, Bombardment).  The squadron became Section O of the new base unit.

Fighter operations
The 474th Fighter-Day Squadron was activated at George Air Force Base, California as the fourth North American F-86H Sabre squadron of the 413th Fighter-Day Wing in October 1957. Its primary mission was training for other squadrons in the wing.    It upgraded to North American F-100 Super Sabres in 1958 and became an operational squadron.  It was inactivated and its personnel and equipment were transferred to the 309th Tactical Fighter Squadron, which moved to George from Turner Air Force Base, Georgia on 15 March 1959.

The squadrons were consolidated in inactive status as the 474th Tactical Electronic Warfare Squadron on 19 September 1985.

Lineage
 474th Bombardment Squadron
 Constituted as the 474th Bombardment Squadron (Medium) on 9 July 1942
 Activated on 17 July 1942
 Disbanded on 1 May 1944
 Reconstituted on 19 September 1985 and consolidated with the 474th Tactical Fighter Squadron as the 474th Tactical Electronic Warfare Squadron

 474th Tactical Electronic Warfare Squadron
 Constituted as the 474th Fighter-Day Squadron on 26 September 1957
 Activated on 8 October 1957
 Redesignated 474th Tactical Fighter Squadron on 1 July 1958
 Inactivated on 15 March 1959
 Consolidated with the 474th Bombardment Squadron as the 474th Tactical Electronic Warfare Squadron on 19 September 1985

Assignments
 335th Bombardment Group, 17 July 1942 – 1 May 1944
 413th Fighter-Day Wing (later 413th Tactical Fighter Wing), 8 October 1957 – 15 March 1959 (atached to 65th Air Division 11 November 1958 – 14 March 1959)

Stations
 Barksdale Field, Louisiana, 17 July 1942 – 1 May 1944
 George Air Force Base, California, 8 October 1957 – 15 March 1959 (operated from Torrejon AB, Spain, 15 November 1958 – 14 March 1959)

Aircraft
 Martin B-26 Marauder]], 1942-1944
 North American F-86H Sabre, 1957-1958
 North American F-100 Super Sabre]], 1958-1959

Campaigns

References

Notes

Bibliography

 
 
 
 
 

Fighter squadrons of the United States Air Force